John Schultz may refer to:

John Schultz (footballer born 1938), Australian rules footballer for Footscray
John W. Schultz (born 1959), Australian rules footballer for St Kilda
John Schultz (catcher) (1866–1941), American baseball player
John Schultz (pitcher), American baseball player
John Schultz (writer) (1932–2017), American writer and professor
John Schultz (director) (born 1960), American film director, screenwriter, and producer
John Christian Schultz (1840–1896), Manitoban politician